Gordon A. Alles (November 26, 1901 – January 21, 1963), was an American chemist and pharmacologist who did extensive research on the isolation and properties of insulin for the treatment of diabetics. He is also credited with discovering and publishing the physiological effects of amphetamine and methylenedioxyamphetamine (MDA). He is the first person to have prepared amphetamine sulfate, although not the amphetamine molecule. Alles first reported the physiological properties of amphetamine as a synthetic analog of ephedrine, and therefore received credit for this discovery. He enjoyed large royalties from Smith, Kline & French (SKF) because he sold his patent rights for amphetamine to the company and it enjoyed large sales. Several popular products sold by SKF contained amphetamine, including Benzedrine pills and inhalers, Dexedrine pills and Dexamyl tablets. Counterfeit drugs such as Profetamine (a generic form of amphetamine sulfate) appeared, aiming to circumvent Alles' 'weak' patent.

Career
Alles received his BS (1922), MS (1924), and PhD (1926) degrees from California Institute of Technology (Caltech). From 1931 he was a lecturer in pharmacology at the University of California Medical School in San Francisco, and from 1951 he was Professor in Residence of pharmacology at UCLA. From 1934 to 1951 he was a consultant for the SKF laboratories. He was owner of the Alles Chemical Research Laboratories in Pasadena, and had been a Caltech research associate since 1939. In 1958 he gave Caltech a gift of $350,000 which financed, in large part, the five-story Gordon A. Alles Laboratory for Molecular Biology.

Alles was primarily interested in natural and synthetic drug chemicals and the relationship between their molecular structures and their biological actions. In 1928 he discovered the physiological properties of benzedrine (amphetamine) and he contributed to its development as a drug. This drug and dextroamphetamine, which was developed from the discovery, have had worldwide medical use as general brain stimulants.

Alles also spent time in Tahiti, where he was investigating the possibilities of developing tranquilizers from alkaloids in a native drink called kava.

Quote from On Speed

References

1901 births
1963 deaths
20th-century American chemists
California Institute of Technology alumni
University of California, Los Angeles faculty
Place of birth missing